The Blériot-SPAD S.58 was a French racing aircraft developed in the early 1920s.

Design and development
The S.58 was derived from the S.41 and was a single-seat racer biplane which was made from wood and canvas. Although the S.58 was built for the Coupe Deutsch de la Meurthe of 1922, the pilot, Jean Casale, quickly gave up following the failure of one of the S.58's radiators.

Specifications

See also

References

Biplanes
S.58
Single-engined tractor aircraft
Aircraft first flown in 1922